The Arunachal Pradesh Police is the law enforcement agency for the state of Arunachal Pradesh in the Republic of India after all it is a law enforcement agency but it also is involved in antiinsurgency operations in the state  of Arunachal Pradesh and in the areas of Assam that border Arunachal Pradesh. 

It has special agency's to deal with militancy in the state and these agency's are involved in activities other than law enforcement in the state. The Arunachal Pradesh Police Headquarters is located in Itanagar.

Organisational structure
Arunachal Pradesh Police comes under direct control of Department of Home Affairs, Government of Arunachal Pradesh.
The Arunachal Pradesh Police is headed by Director General of Police (DGP).

Special agencies
 Intelligence Unit
 Security Battalion
 Commando Force
Civil police

References

Government of Arunachal Pradesh
State law enforcement agencies of India
Year of establishment missing
Government agencies with year of establishment missing